Lehtmetsa is a village in Anija Parish, Harju County, Estonia, just south of the town of Kehra. 

The village is situated on the left bank of the Jägala river.

As of August 1, 2020, the village had a population of 626.

History 
The apartment buildings in the village were built between 1972-1988.

The local sovkhoz opened kindergarten Lepatriinu on March 1, 1980. It is currently operated by Anija parish.

Social care home Kehra Kodu was opened in 2012.

References

Further reading 
 Miidla, Ants (2014). Kehra Lood (in Estonian). MTÜ Kehra Raudteejaam. .

External links 
 Anija Parish homepage

Villages in Harju County